The Second Battle of Kidal was a battle during the Mali War, when MNLA forces in control of Kidal attacked Prime Minister Moussa Mara's convoy during a visit to the town. Consequently, Malian government forces launched an offensive to retake the city, successfully recapturing it.

Since the foreign intervention in Mali, Kidal was retaken by French, Malian, and Chadian troops. On 17 May 2014, Moussa Mara, the Malian prime minister came to visit Kidal.

The battle

Prime Minister's visit and hostage-taking

On 17 May, in Kidal, the Prime Minister convoy's was attacked in the streets of the city. As a result, the Prime Minister condemned the violence as "...a declaration of war" and promised an "...appropriate response."

On 18 May 1500 Malian soldiers arrived in the city following the capture of areas of the governorate by the MNLA. During the capture of this government building, the MNLA captured around 30 officials but they were released soon after.

Malian army offensive 

On 21 May, the Malian army launched an offensive to retake the city. The fighting lasted five hours after the military camp number 1 was captured by the MNLA. After the fighting, the Malian soldiers fled towards Gao, others fled to the military camp number 2, held by the French troops and Minusma. 50 Malian soldiers were killed and 40 wounded in the fighting.

According to MNLA, they seized "...50 brand new 4 x 4 vehicles," 12 armored vehicles and tons of ammunition and weapons.

References

2014 in Mali
Kidal
Kidal
Kidal
Kidal
May 2014 events in Africa
Kidal